Dorcadion subvestitum is a species of beetle in the family Cerambycidae. It was described by K. Daniel in 1901. It is known from Turkey.

References

subvestitum
Beetles described in 1901